Rose Williams may refer to:

Rose Williams (artist) (c. 1915–2015), Navajo potter
Rose Williams (actress) (b.1994), English actress
W. E. D. Ross (1912–1995), Canadian actor, playwright and writer, who sometimes wrote under the pseudonym Rose Williams